Nimasara Atharagalla (born 7 May 1999) is a Sri Lankan cricketer. He made his Twenty20 debut for Chilaw Marians Cricket Club in the 2018–19 SLC Twenty20 Tournament on 16 February 2019. He made his List A debut on 24 March 2021, for Kurunegala Youth Cricket Club in the 2020–21 Major Clubs Limited Over Tournament.

References

External links
 

1999 births
Living people
Sri Lankan cricketers
Chilaw Marians Cricket Club cricketers
Kurunegala Youth Cricket Club cricketers